Patiliai Tuidraki (July 29, 1969 - September 26, 2002) was a dual international rugby union player. Tuidraki joined the Toyota Motor Co. in 1995 making him their first foreign player.

In 2002 Tuidraki died of cardiac failure in Nakavu, Fiji.

References

External links
Player Profile
Teivovo Player Profile

1969 births
2002 deaths
Fijian rugby union players
Fiji international rugby union players
Japanese rugby union players
Japan international rugby union players
Expatriate rugby union players in Japan
Fijian expatriate rugby union players
Fijian expatriate sportspeople in Japan
Sportspeople from Lautoka
Rugby union wings